Sir Colville Adrian de Rune Barclay  (17 September 1869 – 2 June 1929) was a British diplomat who served as chargé d'affaires in Washington D.C., minister to Sweden and Hungary and ambassador to Portugal.

Career
Barclay entered the Diplomatic Service as an attaché in 1894 and was posted to Vienna. In 1897 he was transferred to the embassy in Paris where for five years he was private secretary to the ambassador, Sir Edmund Monson. He also acted as secretary to the international commission of inquiry into the Dogger Bank incident which met in 1905. From Paris, Barclay was posted to Rio de Janeiro, Bucharest, Sofia and Belgrade before being promoted in 1913 to be Counsellor at the embassy at Washington, D.C. where he remained throughout the First World War; towards the end of the war he was chargé d'affaires in the absence of the ambassador, Lord Reading. After the war he was appointed Minister to Sweden 1919–24, and to Hungary 1924–28. Finally he was appointed ambassador to Portugal in June 1928 but died after an operation in London a year later.

Honours
Colville Barclay was appointed MVO while serving in the British Embassy in Paris in 1903 when King Edward VII visited that city. While Barclay was in Washington he was appointed CBE in 1917 and CB in the 1919 Birthday Honours. He was knighted KCMG in the 1922 New Year Honours and was made a Privy Counsellor in June 1928 on his appointment to Portugal.

Family
Colville Barclay was the third son of Sir Colville Arthur Durell Barclay, 11th Baronet, whose mother came from the French family de Rune. In 1912 he married Sarita Enriqueta Ward, daughter of the sculptor and explorer Herbert Ward; they had three sons, the eldest of whom, Colville Herbert Sanford Barclay, became the 14th baronet in succession to his father's two brothers. Two years after Sir Colville died, Lady Barclay married Sir Robert Vansittart, whose first wife had died in 1928.

Offices held

References
BARCLAY, Rt. Hon. Sir Colville (Adrian de Rune), Who Was Who, A & C Black, 1920–2008; online edn, Oxford University Press, Dec 2007, retrieved 29 May 2012
Obituary, The Times, London, 4 June 1929

External links

1869 births
1929 deaths
Ambassadors of the United Kingdom to Sweden
Ambassadors of the United Kingdom to Hungary
Ambassadors of the United Kingdom to Portugal
Younger sons of baronets
Knights Commander of the Order of St Michael and St George
Companions of the Order of the Bath
Knights Commander of the Order of the British Empire
Members of the Royal Victorian Order
Members of the Privy Council of the United Kingdom